Show Me is a 2004 Canadian psychological thriller written and directed by Cassandra Nicolaou and starring Michelle Nolden, Kett Turton and Katharine Isabelle.

Plot
When two squeegee kids, Jackson (Kett Turton) and Jenna (Katharine Isabelle) descend upon Sarah (Michelle Nolden) and her luxury sedan, the fuse is lit on a tense cat and mouse tale of captors and captives. Sarah is forced to continue her trip to an isolated cottage where the twisted trio bait and entice one another in a reckless search for truth. Show Me plunges us into a maze of mystery, desire, memory and self-sacrifice.

Cast
 Michelle Nolden – Sarah
 Kett Turton – Jackson
 Katharine Isabelle – Jenna
 Gabriel Hogan – Carl
 Allegra Fulton – Sam
 J. Adam Brown – Gas station attendant

External links
 
 
 

2004 films
Canadian psychological thriller films
English-language Canadian films
2004 psychological thriller films
Lesbian-related films
2000s English-language films
2000s Canadian films